Krešimir Ganjto (born 7 November 1955) is a Croatian football manager.

He took charge at Odra in January 2023, after working for Trnje, Trešnjevka, Karlovac, Vrbovec, Hrvatski Dragovoljac, Segesta and Lučko. He has also worked as a scout for Dinamo Zagreb and at NK Zagreb's football academy.

References

1955 births
Living people
Croatian football managers
NK Karlovac managers
NK Hrvatski Dragovoljac managers
HNK Segesta managers
NK Lučko managers
Croatian Football League managers
GNK Dinamo Zagreb non-playing staff